Brigham is a municipality located in the province of Quebec, Canada. The population as of the Canada 2011 Census was 2,457. Part of the Brome-Missisquoi Regional County Municipality, in the administrative region of Estrie, the municipality is west of Cowansville and close to Bromont.

History
Founded in 1855, its name became Adamsville in 1961, in honour of George Adams, owner of the land on which the church was founded in 1873. In 1980, there was a further name-change in favour of Brigham – this time to pay homage to Erratus Oakley Brigham, owner of the town's largest business (a brick factory) throughout the mid-19th century.

Demographics

Population

Language

Attractions
The Brigham area is home to two covered bridges, one of which was totally restored in 2001. The neo-Renaissance Brigham Manor, built in 1865, is now a dazzling hotel. Brigham is referenced in the 1938 film Love Finds Andy Hardy.

See also
List of municipalities in Quebec
2005 Brigham municipal election

References

Municipalities in Quebec
Incorporated places in Brome-Missisquoi Regional County Municipality